NK Papuk is a Croatian football club based in the town of Orahovica in Slavonia, Croatia.

Football clubs in Croatia
Association football clubs established in 1925
1925 establishments in Croatia
Football clubs in Virovitica-Podravina County